Henri (Hendrik) de Man (17 November 1885 – 20 June 1953) was a Belgian politician and leader of the Belgian Labour Party (POB-BWP). He was one of the leading socialist theoreticians of his period and, during the German occupation of Belgium during World War II, was heavily involved in collaboration.

World War I and the interwar period
A politically active socialist, he nevertheless fought with the Belgian army and supported the Allied cause in World War I.  After the war, he taught sociology for a time at the University of Washington, then started a workers' education school in Belgium, before moving back to Germany where he taught for some years at the University of Frankfurt. He was at odds there with the predominant, leftwing and communist movements surrounding some of his colleagues. He was allied with Eugen Diederichs, a conservative publisher in Jena. Henri de Man's antisemitism, expressed openly in his memoir of 1941, Après Coup, developed during his years in Germany, although he lived in marriage with at least one Jewish woman (Après Coup, Brussels: Editions de la Toison d'Or, 1941).

Returning to Belgium after the Reichstag fire (his books were not popular with Hitler, and de Man was always a maverick relative to others' ideologies) he became Vice President of the Belgian Labour Party (POB-BWP).  Upon the death of Emile Vandervelde in 1938, he assumed its presidency. He was Minister of Finance from 1936 to 1938.

His views on socialism and his revision of Marxism were controversial.  His promotion of the idea of "planisme", or planning, was widely influential in the early 1930s, in particular among the Non-Conformist Movement in France, a movement also called the Third Way; he was connected briefly to the Personalist Emmanuel Mounier, and even thought of himself as something of a "13th century Thomist".

The doctrine of Henri de Man intended to overcome the successive crises of capitalism by the nationalization of bank credit and an elevation of the degree of authority of the State in financial affairs, while preserving the structures of a capitalist economic system. The “planism” refuted the socialization of the means of production and the construction of a classless society, but on the contrary sought to encourage the private sector by freeing it from certain monopolies entrusted to the State and making it the protector of free competition and individual initiative. From a tactical point of view, marked by the crushing of the German Social Democrats by Hitler, which he attributes to the defection of the middle classes towards the NSDAP, de Man thinks it necessary to move towards a rapprochement with liberal parties.

Plan de Man

De Man was responsible for a plan which some say was devised to halt the rise of fascism in Belgium, but according to most other historians—as even his own memoirs attest—was part of his own turn toward fascism.  This became overwhelmingly clear when he served as de facto prime minister directly under the Nazi occupation from June 1940. This plan became widely known as 'Het Plan de Man' and was an example of planism. While some assert that the plan is comparable to Franklin Roosevelt's New Deal, others point out that it was quite unlike the New Deal, being not a safety net of welfare and other benefits, but was an anti-democratic movement invented by a man disillusioned with democracy and the working class.  The de Man Plan would have removed political power from the workers and their unions, leaving them only the appearance of representation, and vested it instead in owners and government. When he proposed it on the floor of the parliament, his opponents shouted,"That is pure fascism" in a debate that caused de Man to suffer a stroke on the spot, and paralyzed him for almost three months.    Freedom of the press was also to be curtailed by Henri de Man.

Collaboration

De Man was an adviser to King Leopold III and his mother, Queen Elisabeth. Having lived extensively in Germany, and "loving" the country as he said, throughout the 1930s in Belgium he advocated accommodating Hitler's expansionist policies to save Belgium from the crushing fate it had previously suffered in World War I, the policy that was called appeasement by other democratic nations. After the "capitulation" of the Belgian Army in 1940, he issued a manifesto to POB-BWP members, welcoming the German occupation as a field of neutralist action during the war: "For the working classes and for socialism, this collapse of a decrepit world, far from being a disaster, is a deliverance."

He was involved in setting up an umbrella trade union, the Unie van Hand- en Geestesarbeiders/Union des Travailleurs Manuels et Intellectuels (UHGA-UTMI) which would unify the existing trade unions and moreover aim at the integration of manual and intellectual workers. That was branded by longtime socialists a fascist plan, and UHGA-UTMI was considered a fascist organization because workers had little or no control of this "union". As de Man moved steadily to the right, he also opposed a free press, as he wrote himself in his memoire, entitled Après Coup.

During several months, he was (at least in his own eyes) the de facto prime minister of Belgium, serving under the German generals Alexander von Falkenhausen and Eggert Reeder, the actual Belgian ministers having all fled the country during the Battle of Belgium to form the Belgian government in exile. Nevertheless, he eventually was mistrusted both by Flemish Nazi collaborators (for his Belgicist views) and by the Nazi authorities, who forbade him to give any more public speeches after Easter 1941. Seeing he had lost his grip on events, he went into self-imposed exile.

Exile and death
After leaving Belgium, de Man lived for years in German-occupied Paris seeing his mistress Lucienne Didier; with her in occupied Paris he was part of the circle surrounding Ernst Jünger. However, with the advance of the Allied troops in May 1945, fearing capture, he fled to an Alpine cottage in La Clusaz, in the Haute Savoie region of France. After the liberation, he crossed the border to Switzerland and lived in the Grison mountains near Austria.

He died with his young wife in 1953 in a collision between his car and a train, a death that his son Jan de Man and others thought was probably a suicide. Henri de Man had been depressed and immobilized in Switzerland for years, prevented from returning to Belgium by the threat of trial and imprisonment for treason.

He was convicted in absentia of treason after the war.  His nephew, the literary theorist Paul de Man, became famous in the United States as a leading proponent of "deconstructionism." After his death in 1983, Paul de Man was found to have written articles for a collaborationist newspaper in Belgium, some of which expressed antisemitic themes. This discovery prompted a broader re-evaluation of Paul de Man's work, as well as his relationship to Hendrik, who had been a fatherlike figure to him.

Bibliography

Publications 
 Au pays du Taylorisme, Bruxelles, éd. "Le Peuple", 1919.
 Zur Psychologie des Sozialismus, Jena, E. Diederichs, 1927.
 Au-delà du marxisme, Bruxelles, L'Églantine, 1927. (Rééd., Paris, Alcan, 1929; Seuil, 1974)
 Socialisme et marxisme, Bruxelles, L'Églantine, 1928.
 Joie du travail, enquête basée sur des témoignages d'ouvriers et d'employés, Paris, Librairie Félix Alcan, 1930.
 Réflexions sur l'économie dirigée, Bruxelles et Paris, L'Églantine, 1932.
 Nationalisme et socialisme, Paris, [éditeur non indiqué], 1932.
 Marx redécouvert, [Der neu entdeckte Marx], traduction de l'allemand par Michel Brélaz, Genève, Association pour l'étude de l'œuvre d'Henri de Man, 1980 [1932].
 Le Socialisme constructif, traduit de l'allemand par L. C. Herbert, Paris, Paris, Librairie Félix Alcan, 1933.
 Pour un plan d'action, Paris, M. Rivière, [1934].
 Le Plan du travail, Bruxelles, Institut d'économie européenne, 1934. Éditions Labor, 1935.
 L'exécution du plan du travail, Anvers, de Sikkel, 1935.
 L'idée socialiste suivi du Plan de travail, traduction d'Alexandre Kojevnikov et Henry Corbin, Paris, Bernard Grasset, [1935].
 Corporatisme et socialisme, Bruxelles, Éditions Labor, 1935.
 Masses et chefs, Bruxelles, La Nouvelle églantine, 1937.
 (avec Lucovic Zoretti, Léo Moulin, M. Somerhausen et Georges Lefranc, Les problèmes d'ensemble du fascisme, semaine d'études d'Uccle-Bruxelles, 10–15 juillet 1934, Paris, Centre confédéral d'éducation ouvrière, [1939].
 Après coup, mémoires, Bruxelles et Paris, Éditions de la Toison d'or et PUF, [1941] (plusieurs rééditions).
 Herinneringen, Antwerpen, de Sikkel, Arnheim, van Loghum Slaterus, 1941.
 Réflexions sur la paix, Paris et Bruxelles, Éditions de la Toison d'Or, 1942.
 Cahiers de ma montagne, Bruxelles, Éditions de la Toison d'or, 1944.
 Au-delà du nationalisme. Vers un gouvernement mondial, Genève, Éditions du Cheval ailé, 1946.
 Cavalier seul. 45 années de socialisme européen, Genève, Éditions du Cheval ailé, 1948.
 Jacques Cœur, argentier du Roy, [Jacques Cœur, der konigliche kaufmann Paris, 1950], Tardy, 1951.
 L'Ère des masses et le déclin de la civilisation, [Vermassung und Kulturverfall], traduit de l'allemand par Fernand Delmas, Paris, Flammarion, 1954.
 Le "dossier Léopold III" et autres documents sur la période de la seconde guerre mondiale, édité par Michel Brélaz, Genève, Éditions des Antipodes, 1989.

References

Bibliography

, especially chapter 4.

Special issue of the Revue européenne des sciences sociales, XII/31 (1974) entitled "Sur l'oeuvre d'Henri de Man" under the direction of Ivo Rens and Michel Brélaz

External links
Henri de Man archive (available online) at International Institute of Social History
Entry in the Biographie nationale de Belgique
 

1885 births
1953 deaths
Politicians from Antwerp
Finance ministers of Belgium
University of Washington faculty
Belgian Labour Party politicians
Belgian collaborators with Nazi Germany
Belgian Army personnel of World War I
People convicted of treason
People convicted in absentia
Road incident deaths in Switzerland
Belgian fascists